Mayahi Department (var. Mayaki) is a department of the Maradi Region in Niger. Its capital lies at the city of Mayahi. In the mid-1990s, the Department (then titled an Arrondissiment) had a population of 125,000, with 2,200 in Mayahi town. As of 2011, the department had a total population of 546,826 people.

References

Departments of Niger
Maradi Region